Vici Properties Inc. is a real estate investment trust (REIT) specializing in casino properties, based in New York City. It was formed in 2017 as a spin-off from Caesars Entertainment Corporation as part of its bankruptcy reorganization. It owns 48 casinos, hotels, and racetracks and 4 golf courses around the United States and Canada.

History
Vici Properties was formed as part of the Chapter 11 bankruptcy reorganization of Caesars Entertainment Operating Company (CEOC), the largest division of Caesars Entertainment. After placing CEOC into bankruptcy in January 2015, Caesars proposed splitting CEOC into two companies: a REIT, which would own the company's casinos, and an operating company, which would manage them. The plan was designed to maximize value for CEOC's creditors by taking advantage of favorable tax treatment for REITs. Several members of Congress opposed the plan, calling it an abuse of the REIT laws. They asked the Internal Revenue Service to deny tax-free status to the spin-off, but their protest went unheeded.

The spin-off of Vici to CEOC's creditors was completed on October 6, 2017, the day that CEOC emerged from bankruptcy. Vici began with a portfolio of nineteen casinos and racetracks, all leased to Caesars at a total initial annual rent of $630 million, and four golf courses. The company's name was adopted from the phrase "Veni, vidi, vici," commonly attributed to Julius Caesar.

Vici acquired Harrah's Las Vegas from Caesars in December 2017 for $1.1 billion, and leased it back at an initial annual rent of $87.4 million.

MGM Growth Properties, a REIT affiliated with Caesars competitor MGM Resorts International, offered in January 2018 to acquire Vici for an estimated $5.9 billion. Vici's board rejected the offer, deciding instead to proceed with a planned initial public offering. Vici completed its IPO on the New York Stock Exchange in February 2018, raising $1.2 billion.

The company moved its headquarters to New York City from the Las Vegas area in mid-2018.

Vici completed two transactions with Caesars in 2018, purchasing the Octavius Tower at Caesars Palace for $508 million and Harrah's Philadelphia for $242 million, and leasing them back to Caesars for $35 million and $21 million per year, respectively.

In 2019, Vici made two purchases in conjunction with Penn National Gaming. Vici bought the real estate of the Margaritaville Resort Casino in Louisiana and Greektown Casino–Hotel in Detroit for $261 million and $700 million, respectively, while Penn bought both properties' operating businesses and leased them from Vici for annual rent of $23 million and $56 million, respectively. Vici bought a second casino from Greektown seller Jack Entertainment, Jack Cincinnati Casino, in September 2019, paying $558 million for the real estate; Hard Rock International leased the property for $43 million per year.

In December 2019, Vici bought three casinos in Missouri and West Virginia from Eldorado Resorts in conjunction with Century Casinos: Isle Casino Cape Girardeau, Lady Luck Casino Caruthersville, and Mountaineer Casino, Racetrack and Resort. Vici paid $278 million for the real estate assets, and leased them to Century for $25 million per year. A month later, the company bought two more properties from Jack Entertainment, Jack Cleveland Casino and Jack Thistledown Racino, for a total of $843 million, leasing them back for $66 million per year.

In July 2020, Eldorado Resorts acquired Caesars Entertainment, becoming Vici's primary tenant, and renamed itself to Caesars Entertainment. In connection with this acquisition, Vici bought three properties (Harrah's Atlantic City, Harrah's Laughlin, and Harrah's New Orleans) from Caesars for a total of $1.8 billion, and leased them back to the new Caesars for $154 million per year.

In February 2022, Vici purchased the real estate of the Venetian complex on the Las Vegas Strip from Las Vegas Sands for $4 billion. The acquisition included the Venetian and Palazzo casino hotels and the Sands Expo convention center. Apollo Global Management bought the operating business and leased the property from Vici for $250 million per year.

In April 2022, Vici acquired MGM Growth Properties for $17.2 billion (including $5.7 billion in assumed debt). The purchase added full ownership of thirteen properties to Vici's portfolio, and half ownership of the MGM Grand Las Vegas and Mandalay Bay resorts, and increased Vici's annual revenue by $1 billion, along with making it the largest land owner on the Las Vegas Strip, with over 660 acres. Vici bought out the other half interest in the MGM Grand and Mandalay Bay from Blackstone for $1.27 billion plus $1.5 billion in assumed debt in January 2023.

Vici expanded to Canada in 2023, acquiring four casinos in Alberta from Pure Canadian Gaming for US$201 million.

Properties

Leased to Caesars Entertainment
 Caesars Atlantic City – Atlantic City, New Jersey
 Caesars Palace – Paradise, Nevada
 Harrah's Atlantic City — Atlantic City, New Jersey
 Harrah's Council Bluffs – Council Bluffs, Iowa
 Harrah's Gulf Coast – Biloxi, Mississippi
 Harrah's Joliet – Joliet, Illinois (80 percent stake)
 Harrah's Lake Tahoe – Stateline, Nevada
 Harrah's Las Vegas – Paradise, Nevada
 Harrah's Laughlin — Laughlin, Nevada
 Harrah's Metropolis – Metropolis, Illinois
 Harrah's New Orleans — New Orleans, Louisiana
 Harrah's North Kansas City – North Kansas City, Missouri
 Harrah's Philadelphia – Chester, Pennsylvania
 Harveys Lake Tahoe – Stateline, Nevada
 Horseshoe Bossier City – Bossier City, Louisiana
 Horseshoe Council Bluffs – Council Bluffs, Iowa
 Horseshoe Hammond – Hammond, Indiana
 Horseshoe Tunica – Tunica Resorts, Mississippi
 Tunica Roadhouse – Tunica Resorts, Mississippi (closed)

Leased to MGM Resorts International
 Beau Rivage – Biloxi, Mississippi
 Borgata Hotel Casino and Spa – Atlantic City, New Jersey
 Excalibur Hotel and Casino – Paradise, Nevada
 Luxor Las Vegas – Paradise, Nevada
 Mandalay Bay – Paradise, Nevada
 MGM Grand Detroit – Detroit, Michigan
 MGM Grand Las Vegas – Paradise, Nevada
 MGM National Harbor – Oxon Hill, Maryland
 MGM Northfield Park – Northfield, Ohio
 MGM Springfield – Springfield, Massachusetts
 New York-New York Hotel and Casino – Paradise, Nevada
 Park MGM – Paradise, Nevada
 Yonkers Raceway & Empire City Casino – Yonkers, New York

Leased to Pure Canadian Gaming
 Pure Casino Calgary — Calgary, Alberta
 Pure Casino Edmonton — Edmonton, Alberta
 Pure Casino Lethbridge — Lethbridge, Alberta
 Pure Casino Yellowhead — Edmonton, Alberta

Leased to other companies
 Caesars Southern Indiana – Elizabeth, Indiana (leased to the Eastern Band of Cherokee Indians)
 Century Casino Cape Girardeau – Cape Girardeau, Missouri (leased to Century Casinos)
 Century Casino Caruthersville – Caruthersville, Missouri (leased to Century Casinos)
 Gold Strike Tunica – Tunica Resorts, Mississippi (leased to Cherokee Nation Businesses)
 Hard Rock Casino Cincinnati — Cincinnati, Ohio (leased to Hard Rock International)
 Hard Rock Las Vegas/The Mirage – Paradise, Nevada (leased to Hard Rock International)
 Hollywood Casino at Greektown — Detroit, Michigan (leased to Penn National Gaming)
 Jack Cleveland Casino – Cleveland, Ohio (leased to Jack Entertainment)
 Jack Thistledown Racino – North Randall, Ohio (leased to Jack Entertainment)
 Margaritaville Resort Casino – Bossier City, Louisiana (leased to Penn National Gaming)
 Mountaineer Casino, Racetrack and Resort – New Cumberland, West Virginia (leased to Century Casinos)
 The Venetian Las Vegas – Paradise, Nevada (leased to Apollo Global Management)

Golf courses
The company owns and operates four golf courses:

 Cascata – Boulder City, Nevada
 Chariot Run – Laconia, Indiana
 Grand Bear – Saucier, Mississippi
 Rio Secco – Henderson, Nevada

Former properties
 Bally's Atlantic City – Atlantic City, New Jersey – Sold in 2020.
 Bluegrass Downs – Paducah, Kentucky – Closed in 2019; donated in 2020.
 Harrah's Louisiana Downs – Bossier City, Louisiana – Sold in 2021.
 Harrah's Reno – Reno, Nevada – Closed and sold in 2020.

References

External links
 

2017 establishments in Nevada
2018 initial public offerings
American companies established in 2017
Real estate companies established in 2017
Publicly traded companies based in New York City
Companies listed on the New York Stock Exchange
Gambling companies of the United States
Real estate investment trusts of the United States
Corporate spin-offs